Mark Woodhouse may refer to:

 Mark Woodhouse (basketball) (born 1982), British professional basketball player
 Mark Woodhouse (cricketer) (born 1967), Zimbabwean cricketer